Faxonella creaseri is a species of crayfish (family Cambaridae, order Reptantia) which belongs to the larger group of so-called decapoda. It is one of the four species in the family Faxonella.

The species is found in the northern lakes and rivers in North America.

It is documented that the species is found in Louisiana.

Taxonomic classification 

A modern update of the systemic classification was given by Fetzner et al.: (2005).

 Order decapoda - 2700 families, 15,000 species Latreille, 1802
 Suborder crayfish and crabs Reptantia = Macrura reptantia
 Infraorder Astacidea, crayfish and lobsters
 Superfamily crayfish Astacoidea  Latreille, 1802
 Family Cambaridae  Hobbs, 1942
 Sub-family Cambarinae Hobbs, 1942
 Group Faxonella Creaser, 1933
 Faxonella beyeri (Penn, 1950) - North America
 Faxonella blairi Hayes and Reimer, 1977 - North America
 Faxonella clypeata (Hay, 1899) - North America
 Faxonella creaseri Walls, 1968 - North America

References

External links 

 Global Crayfish Resources - The Carnegie Museum of Natural History (eng). Accessed 27 January 2014.
 de Grave, Sammy, et al., «A classification of living and fossil genera of decapod crustaceans», in: Raffles Bulletin of Zoology. Suppl. 21, 2009, page 1–109

Cambaridae
Fauna of the United States
Crustaceans described in 1968